LauncherOne is a two-stage orbital launch vehicle developed and flown by Virgin Orbit that began operational flights in 2021, after being in development from 2007 to 2020. It is an air-launched rocket, designed to carry smallsat payloads of up to  into Sun-synchronous orbit (SSO), following air launch from a carrier aircraft at high altitude. The rocket is carried to the upper atmosphere on a modified Boeing 747-400, named Cosmic Girl, and released over ocean. Initial work on the program was done by Virgin Galactic, another Virgin Group subsidiary, before a separate entity — Virgin Orbit — was formed in 2017 to complete development and operate the launch service provider business separately from the passenger-carrying Virgin Galactic business.

The first successful flight was on 17 January 2021, which delivered a payload of 10 CubeSats to low Earth orbit (LEO). Three further launches have since successfully reached orbit. An initial test flight was unsuccessful on 25 May 2020, when the rocket failed to reach space.

LauncherOne was the first all liquid-fuelled air-launched orbital rocket.

From 2007 to 2015, Virgin had intended LauncherOne to be a somewhat smaller vehicle with a  payload to low Earth orbit. In 2015, Virgin modified the vehicle design to better target their intended market, and increased the vehicle payload capacity to  launched to a  Sun-synchronous orbit, suitable for CubeSats and small payloads. Virgin Orbit is targeting a launch price around US$12 million for the rocket.

History 
Virgin Galactic began working on the LauncherOne concept in 2007, and the technical specifications were first described in some detail in late 2009. The LauncherOne configuration was proposed to be an expendable, two-stage, liquid-fueled rocket air-launched from a White Knight Two carrier aircraft. This would make it a similar configuration to that used by Orbital Sciences' Pegasus, or a smaller version of the StratoLaunch air-launched rocket system.

By 2012, several commercial customers had signed early contracts for launches signaling demand-side support for new small commercial-oriented launch vehicles. These included GeoOptics, Skybox Imaging, Spaceflight Services, and Planetary Resources. Both Surrey Satellite Technology and Sierra Nevada Space Systems were at the time reported to be developing satellite buses "optimized to the design of LauncherOne". In October 2012, Virgin announced that LauncherOne would be designed so that it could place  in Sun-synchronous orbit (SSO).

Design and construction of the first engines was completed by 2014. NewtonOne was tested up to a full-duration burn of five minutes. NewtonTwo made several short-duration firings by early 2014. Ultimately, however, neither NewtonOne nor NewtonTwo would be used on LauncherOne.

In 2015, Virgin Galactic established a  research, development, and manufacturing center for LauncherOne at Long Beach Airport, California. The company reported in March 2015, that they were on schedule to begin test flights of LauncherOne with its NewtonThree engine by the end of 2016, but they did not achieve that objective.

On 25 June 2015, the company signed a contract with OneWeb Ltd. for 39 satellite launches for its satellite constellation with an option for an additional 100 launches, but in 2018 OneWeb canceled all but four, prompting a lawsuit from Virgin Orbit. OneWeb filed for bankruptcy protection in 2020.

The carrier aircraft subsequently was changed to a used Boeing 747-400, Cosmic Girl, previously operated by Virgin Galactic's sister company, Virgin Atlantic, and purchased outright by Virgin Group from Boeing upon the expiration of that airframe's lease. The 747 will allow a larger LauncherOne to carry the heavier payloads. The modification work on the company's 747 was expected to be completed in 2016, to be followed by orbital test launches of the rocket in 2017.

It was further announced in December 2015 that the revised LauncherOne would utilize the larger NewtonThree rocket engine on the booster stage, with the NewtonFour powering the second stage. NewtonThree was to be a -thrust engine, and began hot-fire testing by March 2015. The NewtonFour engine would power the second stage. NewtonThree generate  of thrust while NewtonFour deliver  to the second stage and is capable of multiple restarts.

On 2 March 2017, Virgin Galactic announced that its 200-member LauncherOne team was being spun off into a new company called Virgin Orbit. A subsidiary company of Virgin Orbit called Vox Space was created to carry out business which require strict security requirements. , the company planned to fly approximately twice a month by 2020.

In September 2017, the first test flights of LauncherOne were delayed to 2018. By June 2018, the Virgin Orbit captive carry flight testing campaign for LauncherOne, including a planned drop test of an unfueled rocket, was licensed to begin in July 2018, and could run for up to six months.

In the event, no LauncherOne test flights occurred in 2018 and were delayed further, to December 2019, with only the carrier aircraft beginning to fly in 2018. The first three test flights of Cosmic Girl, including the pylon but not the rocket, happened on 23, 25 and 27 August 2018. A high-speed taxi test, with a rocket mounted beneath the aircraft, took place in early November 2018. The aircraft flew its first test flight with both pylon and rocket attached on 18 November 2018.

On 17 March 2022 Polish Space Agency and Virgin Orbit signed an agreement to use LauncherOne as means to send satelites into orbit, with its first launch from Poland planned for 2023.

Flights 

The maiden flight of LauncherOne took place on 25 May 2020. The flight failed a few seconds after the ignition of the rocket due to a premature shutdown of the first stage engine, caused by a break in a propellant feed line, and the rocket did not reach space. The launch failure was attributed to a failure of a high-pressure liquid oxygen fuel line in the NewtonThree engine. Due to the failure, oxygen was no longer supplied to the engine and the flight was terminated. The issue with the fuel line was addressed by strengthening the broken components.

The second launch took place on 17 January 2021, and was the first to successfully reach orbit. The rocket deployed 10 CubeSats for NASA's Educational Launch of Nanosatellites mission (ELaNa 20). Cosmic Girl took off from Mojave Air and Space Port in California at 18:38 UTC. The aircraft launched the LauncherOne rocket at 19:39 UTC. On 17 January 2021, both NewtonThree and NewtonFour performed as expected. During launch, NewtonFour fired twice; once to inject the second stage and the payloads into a transfer orbit, and again to circularize the orbit. 

On 9 January 2023, the first UK launch took place, but it was unsuccessful due to an issue in the upper segment of the rocket.

Design 

LauncherOne is a two-stage air-launched vehicle.

Engines 
LauncherOne will be a two-stage air-launched vehicle using Newton engines, RP-1/LOX liquid rocket engines. The second stage was to be powered by NewtonOne, a  thrust engine. Both engines have been designed, and  first articles have been built. NewtonOne was tested up to a full-duration burn of five minutes. NewtonTwo made several short-duration firings by early 2014.

NewtonThree is a -thrust engine, and began hot-fire tests . More recent reports suggest that a NewtonThree will power the first stage of LauncherOne.

2015 redesign: new engines, larger payloads, new carrier aircraft 

News reports in September 2015 indicate that the higher payload is to be achieved by longer fuel tanks and the NewtonThree engine but this will mean that White Knight Two will no longer be able to lift it to launch altitude. The rocket will be carried to launch altitude by a Boeing 747. The revised LauncherOne will utilize both the Newton 3 and Newton 4 rocket engines.

In December 2015, Virgin announced a change to the carrier plane for LauncherOne, as well as a substantially-larger design point for the rocket itself. The carrier aircraft will now be a Boeing 747, which will in turn allow a larger LauncherOne to carry heavier payloads than previously planned. The modification work on the particular Boeing 747 that Virgin has purchased is expected to be completed in 2016, to be followed by Orbital test launches of the rocket in 2017.

Intended usage 
LauncherOne is designed to launch a  payload to a  Sun-synchronous orbit (SSO), suitable for CubeSats and small payloads. Virgin Orbit has also announced the ability of LauncherOne to send payloads into heliocentric orbit for flybys of Mars, Venus or asteroids.

Launch sites 

Virgin Orbit integrate payloads at their headquarters in Long Beach, California.

LauncherOne is launched from its Cosmic Girl Boeing 747-400 carrier, attached to a pylon on the aircraft's left wing, and released over the ocean at a location depending on the desired orbital inclination. This process avoids typical delays for ground launches due to weather and upper-level winds. William Pomerantz of Virgin Orbit has stated that any airport that can support a Boeing 747 may be used, subject to local legislation.

, the carrier plane has lifted off from the Mojave Air and Space Port in California, United States and Newquay Airport in Cornwall, United Kingdom. The company also has plans to use other airports such as Kennedy Space Center in Florida and Alcântara Space Center in Brazil. Other proposed launch sites include Ellison Onizuka Kona International Airport in Hawaii, José Aponte de la Torre Airport in Puerto Rico, Oita Airport in Japan, Andersen Air Force Base in Guam and Toowoomba Wellcamp Airport in Australia.

Past launches

Future launches

Launch statistics

Launch outcomes

Launch sites

See also 

 NOTS-EV-1 Pilot
 Pegasus (rocket)
 StratoLaunch

References

External links 
 
 
 Release and ignition of LauncherOne on its first orbital flight, video, 17 January 2021.

Microsatellite launch vehicles
Space launch vehicles
Air launch to orbit
Scaled Composites White Knight Two
Virgin Galactic
Virgin Orbit
Rocket launches in 2020
Rocket launches in 2021